The Botswana Girl Guides Association is the national Guiding organisation of Botswana. It serves 10,310 members (as of 2014). Founded in 1924, the girls-only organisation became a full member of the World Association of Girl Guides and Girl Scouts in 1969.

Program

The purpose of the association is "to develop the girls' potential in order to make a responsible citizen in any community". 
The association runs a two-year course on home economics for school dropouts on a national basis, mainly for girls. The participants get a certificate at the end of the second year in either sewing or catering. This project was started in 1981, and some of the graduates are working in local hotels.

See also
 The Botswana Scouts Association

References

World Association of Girl Guides and Girl Scouts member organizations
Scouting and Guiding in Botswana
Youth organizations established in 1924